Anthony McFarland Jr. (born March 4, 1998) is an American football running back for the Pittsburgh Steelers of the National Football League (NFL). He played college football at Maryland, and was selected by the Steelers in the fourth round of the 2020 NFL Draft.

Early years
McFarland attended Ernest Everett Just Middle School in Lake Arbor, Maryland before attending DeMatha Catholic High School in Hyattsville, Maryland. He did not play football his senior season of high school due to injury. Despite this he was still an Under Armour All-American. He committed to the University of Maryland to play college football. At DeMatha, he was a teammate of defensive end Chase Young, who was later selected second overall in the 2020 NFL Draft by the Washington Football Team.

College career
McFarland Jr. redshirted his first year at Maryland in 2017. He played for the first time in two years in 2018. He started five of 12 games, rushing for 1,034 yards on 131 carries with four touchdowns. In 2019, he rushed for 614 yards on 114 carries and eight touchdowns. After the season, he entered the 2020 NFL Draft, forgoing his final two seasons.

Professional career

McFarland was selected by the Pittsburgh Steelers in the fourth round of the 2020 NFL Draft. He made his NFL debut in Week 3 of the 2020 season against the Houston Texans. He had six carries for 42 rushing yards in the 28–21 victory.

On September 1, 2021, McFarland was placed on injured reserve to start the season. He was activated on October 27.

On August 30, 2022, McFarland was waived by the Steelers and was signed to the practice squad the next day. He signed a reserve/future contract on January 12, 2023.

References

External links
Pittsburgh Steelers bio
Maryland Terrapins bio

1998 births
Living people
People from Hyattsville, Maryland
Players of American football from Maryland
Sportspeople from the Washington metropolitan area
American football running backs
Maryland Terrapins football players
Pittsburgh Steelers players